The Potomac Group is a geologic group in Delaware, Maryland, New Jersey, and Virginia. It preserves fossils dating back to the Cretaceous period. An indeterminate tyrannosauroid and Priconodon crassus, a nodosaurid, are known from indeterminate sediments belonging to the Potomac Group. The Potomac Group was initially believed to have been Late Jurassic in age by Othniel Charles Marsh but later studies, such as Clark (1897), have found that the Potomac Group is in fact Early-Late Cretaceous (Aptian-Turonian) in age.

See also

 List of fossiliferous stratigraphic units in Virginia
 Paleontology in Virginia

References

 

Geologic groups of Virginia